Parambikulam River,  one of four tributaries of the Chalakkudi River, originates in the Coimbatore district of Tamil Nadu, India.It flows parallel to and North of Sholayar River and joins Kuriarkutty. Sholayar river flows for 44.8 km and turns North and joins Parambikulam River 1.6 km before Orukumbankutty. Karapara River originates from Nelliyampathy Hills of Palakkad district in Kerala. It flows West and turns South West and drains to the Parambikulam river at Orukumbankutty.

The  Parambikulam Dam has been constructed across the river at Anamalai, located in the Western Ghats of Kerala. This dam ranks number one in India as well as in the top ten dams in the world for volume capacity.

Notes

External links

Rivers of Tamil Nadu
Rivers of Palakkad district
Rivers of India